San Gregorio Magno is a town and comune in the province of Salerno in the Campania region of southern Italy.

Overview
San Gregorio Magno is located in an ethnographic region of Southern Italy with a unique form of folk music played on a specialized bagpipe called a Zampogna.  The instrument is closely associated with the pastoral culture of the region and is played for secular purposes, such as the tarantella folk dance, as well as for religious devotion.  San Gregorio Magno was recently featured in an independent documentary about this musical tradition entitled Zampogna: The Soul of Southern Italy.

Twin towns
 Collegno, Italy
 Grugliasco, Italy

Notes and references

External links

Official website 

Cities and towns in Campania
Localities of Cilento
12th-century Roman Catholic church buildings in Italy